Thomas Douglas may refer to:

 Thomas Douglas, 5th Earl of Selkirk (1771–1820), founder of the Red River Colony
 Thomas Monteath Douglas (1787–1868), officer of the Bengal Army of the East India Company
 Thomas Douglas (American judge) (1790–1855), Florida Supreme Court justice
 Tom Douglas (chef) (born 1958), American chef, restaurateur and writer
 Tommy Douglas (1904–1986), premier of Saskatchewan and leader of the New Democratic Party of Canada
 Tommy Douglas (clarinetist) (1911–1965), American jazz clarinetist
 Tom Douglas (songwriter), American songwriter
 Tom Douglas (footballer) (1910–1943), Scottish footballer

See also
 Tommy Douglas Collegiate, a high school in Saskatoon, Saskatchewan
 Thomas Douglas Guest (1781–1845), British painter